Stuart Airey may refer to:
 Stuart Airey (cricketer) (born 1983), English cricketer
 Stuart Airey (bowls) (born 1971), English lawn bowler